Jalmar Martin "Jay" Kerttula (April 6, 1928 – November 13, 2020) was an American businessman, farmer, and politician in Alaska. A member of the Democratic Party, Kerttula was the longest-serving member of the Alaska Legislature, having served in the House from 1961 to 1963 and 1965 to 1973 and in the Senate from 1973 to 1995. In January 2019, Lyman Hoffman became the longest-serving member in the history of the Alaska Legislature, surpassing Kerttula's tenure.

Early life
Jalmar Kerttula, commonly known as "Jay," was born in Milwaukee, Wisconsin, on April 6, 1928, the son of Finnish immigrants. In 1935 the family relocated to the Matanuska Valley Colony, a New Deal agricultural resettlement program, located Northeast of Anchorage.

Kerttula graduated from Palmer High School and went on to study at the University of Alaska and the University of Washington. Following his graduation Kerttula became the manager of a dairy cooperative. He also worked as a real estate developer in the Matanuska Valley.

In 1955, Kerttula married Helen Joyce Campbell, known as Joyce, who helped manage his office and campaigns throughout his political career. She died in 2015.  Their oldest daughter, Beth Kerttula, was a state representative from Juneau for 15 years, until she left to take a fellowship at Stanford University and from there took a post with the Obama administration.

Political career
Kerttula was first elected to the Alaska House of Representatives in 1960, representing the city of Palmer in the state capital serving from 1961 to 1963. He ran for election again in 1964 and returned to office for four consecutive terms, 1965 to 1973. He was chosen  at the organizational meeting for the body's 1969 session  by his Democratic party peers to serve as the Speaker of the Alaska House of Representatives from 1969 to 1970. In 1972 he was elected to the state senate and served there from 1973 to 1995, and later became the Alaska Senate President (1981–1984).

Legacy
Matanuska-Susitna College has a Jalmar Kerttula Building (called the JKB) named for him. It is where most of the English, computer network support, and biology classes are held. It also houses the academic affairs office, director's office, marketing, student government office, and bookstore.

See also
 Raymond Rebarchek Colony Farm – Rebarchek became Kerttula's stepfather after his father's death in the 1960s

References

External links
 Brief political graveyard bio
 Senate Presidents and Speakers of the Alaska Legislature
 American legislative leaders in the West, 1911-1994
 Jalmar Kerttula at 100 Years of Alaska's Legislature

|-

|-

|-

|-

|-

|-

|-

1928 births
2020 deaths
Democratic Party Alaska state senators
American Lutherans
American people of Finnish descent
American real estate businesspeople
Businesspeople from Alaska
Farmers from Alaska
Farmers from Minnesota
Farmers from Wisconsin
People from Itasca County, Minnesota
People from Palmer, Alaska
Politicians from Milwaukee
Presidents of the Alaska Senate
Speakers of the Alaska House of Representatives
Democratic Party members of the Alaska House of Representatives
University of Alaska alumni
University of Alaska Anchorage people
University of Washington alumni
20th-century American politicians